This is a list of members of the Victorian Legislative Assembly from 1940 to 1943, as elected at the 1940 state election:

 On 15 May 1940, the Labor member for Coburg, Frank Keane, died. Independent Labor candidate Charlie Mutton, who had been expelled from the Labor Party for running against the endorsed candidate, won the resulting by-election on 13 July 1940.
 In August 1940, the United Australia member for Polwarth, Allan McDonald, resigned to contest Division of Corangamite in the 1940 federal election. Country candidate Edward Guye won the resulting by-election on 2 November 1940.
 On 23 November 1940, the United Australia member for Toorak, Sir Stanley Argyle, died. United Australia candidate Henry Thonemann won the resulting by-election on 11 January 1941.
 On 17 February 1942, the Labor member for Port Melbourne, James Murphy, died. Labor candidate Tom Corrigan won the resulting by-election on 18 April 1942.
 On 5 May 1942, the Country member for Gippsland North, Alexander Borthwick, died. Country candidate Bill Fulton won the resulting by-election on 20 June 1942.
 On 26 October 1942, the Labor member for Maryborough and Daylesford, George Frost, died. Labor candidate Clive Stoneham won the resulting by-election on 28 November 1942.

Sources
 Re-member (a database of all Victorian MPs since 1851). Parliament of Victoria.
 Victorian Year Book, 1940–1941, page 42–43.

Members of the Parliament of Victoria by term
20th-century Australian politicians